Jedediah Slason Carvell (16 March 1832 – 14 February 1894) was a Canadian businessman, politician, and office holder.

Accomplishments
From 1877 to 1878, he was the sixth Mayor of Charlottetown. He was also Spain's vice-consul in Prince Edward Island.

In 1879, he was summoned to the Senate of Canada representing the senatorial division of Charlottetown, Prince Edward Island. A Conservative, he resigned in 1889 when he was appointed the fifth Lieutenant Governor of Prince Edward Island. He served until his death in 1894.

References

External links
 
 
 The Honourable Jedediah Slason Carvell at Office of the Lieutenant Governor, Prince Edward Island

1832 births
1894 deaths
Mayors of Charlottetown
Canadian senators from Prince Edward Island
Conservative Party of Canada (1867–1942) senators
Lieutenant Governors of Prince Edward Island